Te Pīhopatanga o Te Tai Tokerau (the bishopric of the North coast; aka Te Hui Amorangi..., lit. the synod...) is an Episcopal polity (or Diocese) of the Anglican Church in Aotearoa, New Zealand and Polynesia. Te Pīhopatanga extends from the Bombay Hills south of Auckland through to Te Rerenga Wairua (the North Cape). According to the 2001 census, there are approximately 25,000 Māori Anglicans within this area. Te Tai Tokerau is one of five pīhopatanga (episcopal units) that comprise Te Pīhopatanga o Aotearoa, the Māori Anglican Church in Aotearoa/New Zealand.

Ministry 
There are ten pastorates (ministry units) within Te Pīhopatanga o Te Tai Tokerau:
(Archdeaconry of Te Tai Tokerau)
 Parengarenga-Ahipara-Peria
 Whangaroa
 South Hokianga
 Waimate Taumarere
 Whangarei
 Northern Wairoa
 Nga Tapuwae o Te Ariki
(Archdeaconry of Tamaki Makaurau)
 Te Mihana Maori o Tamaki Makaurau
 Te Takiwā o Manukau
 CIMAH (Cook Island congregation)

Ministry also takes place in: 
 numerous prison, school and hospital chaplaincies
 Te Whare Ruruhau o Meri, the social service agency based in Auckland
 relational ministries including Kahui Wāhine (Women's ministry) Kahui Tane (Men's ministry) and Kahui Rangatahi (Youth ministry)

Structure 
Te Pīhopatanga is governed by te Hui Amorangi, a representative synod that meets annually. The Komiti Tumuaki executive meets four times a year, and has two subcommittees: Ministry and Education. This executive is responsible for ordination and training matters; and a finance sub-committee.

Te Pīhopatanga comes under the episcopal leadership of te Pīhopa o (the Bishop of) Te Tai Tokerau. Kito Pikaahu was ordained bishop on 24 February 2002 at the age of 37 and remains one of the youngest bishops in the Anglican Communion. Ben Te Haara was the first Pīhopa, from his 7 March 1992 consecration until 2001.

Since 2010, George Connor and John Paterson (archbishop emeritus) have served as Pīhopa Āwhina (honorary assistant bishops).

Hone Kaa was Archdeacon of Tāmaki Makaurau, overseeing the two Auckland pastorates. Tapu Laulu is the Manu Kōkiri (Youth Enabler), identifying and nurturing young leaders across the region.

References

Anglican dioceses in New Zealand